The Confederation of Forest Industries, shortened to ConFor, is the trade association for the forestry industry in the United Kingdom.

It was established to represent forestry and wood-using businesses, from nurseries and growers, to wood processing end-users. It was created to represent the views of the industry to the Forestry Commission and the policy makers within the relevant legislatures and executives.

Structure
It has the largest membership of any representative body within the UK sector and is headquartered in Edinburgh.

Regions
 Scotland - Madderty
 Wales - Caernarfon
 North England - Belford, Northumberland
 East England - Weldon, Northamptonshire
 Home Counties - Sandhurst
 Marches - Newton Abbot
 South West England - Kingsbridge
 England - Newton Abbot

History 

ConFor was created in 2004 and is the first organisation of its kind that has the entire supply chain within its membership, from nurseries and woodland owners, to processors and sawmills. This makes it different from other nations as the trade associations of the forest and wood-using industries are split within the different competing constituents of the supply chain. It is a membership organisation that is funded by and accountable to businesses within the industry.

Policy 
The organisation lobbies governments, parliaments and assemblies of the United Kingdom, Scotland, Wales, Northern Ireland on behalf of members. As a member of the Confederation of European Forest Owners it also lobbies for its members at the European Parliament. Since devolution, rural policy making has been passed to the devolved administrations of the UK, meaning that strategy can vary over the different parts of the country. The devolved administrations of Scotland and Wales have produced their own forestry strategies: The Scottish Forestry Strategy  and Woodlands for Wales  which both view forestry as an integral part in the efforts to tackle climate change. In Scotland and Wales forestry policy resides within the Forestry Commission where, as, in England forestry policy resides in the Department for Environment, Food and Rural Affairs (Defra) with the Forestry Commission England implementing policy.

Context 
Forestry in the UK is split between the Forestry Commission, which is a government agency and the private sector. It breaks down between the private and public sector as:

References

External links
 Confor

Forests and woodlands of the United Kingdom
Organizations established in 2004
Trade associations based in the United Kingdom
Organisations based in Edinburgh